Cyana perornata is a moth of the family Erebidae. It was described by Francis Walker in 1854. It is found in India (Sikkim, Assam) and Sundaland. The habitat consists of lowland forests, extending more weakly into lower montane forests.

References

Cyana
Moths described in 1854